Geometric data analysis comprises geometric aspects of image analysis, pattern analysis, and shape analysis, and the approach of multivariate statistics, which treat arbitrary data sets as clouds of points in a space that is n-dimensional. This includes topological data analysis, cluster analysis, inductive data analysis, correspondence analysis, multiple correspondence analysis, principal components analysis and

See also
Algebraic statistics for algebraic-geometry in statistics
Combinatorial data analysis
Computational anatomy for the study of shapes and forms at the morphome scale
Structured data analysis (statistics)

References
 
 
Approximation of Geodesic Distances for Geometric Data Analysis

Differential geometry and data analysis
Differential Geometry and Statistics, M.K. Murray, J.W. Rice, Chapman and Hall/CRC, 
Ridges in image and data analysis, David Eberly, Springer, 1996, 

Fields of geometry
Multivariate statistics
Spatial analysis
Applied geometry